Radojka Šverko (born 9 April 1948) is a Croatian female singer-songwriter and an alto range artist. 

Šverko was the recipient of many music festival awards, most recently at the Split Festival (2005) for her song Licem u lice (lit. "Face to Face"). She has released numerous albums, singles and EPs for leading Croatian and Yugoslav record labels. She is an actress as well, who appeared in several films.

In February 2015 she sang at the inauguration of Croatian president Kolinda Grabar-Kitarović.

References

External links 
 Biography
 Šverko appeared as actress in films

Living people
20th-century Croatian women singers
1948 births
People from Pazin